Gabriel Bozan (born 15 January 1993) is a Romanian professional kickboxer. He currently competes in the Welterweight division in the Colosseum Tournament. Bozan is a former ISKA World Middleweight Champion. A professional competitor since 2011, he formerly competed for Superkombat Fighting Championship, Vendetta and Golden Fighter Championship. Bozan is also a former national junior Karate champion and junior European champion. He holds the black belt.

Kickboxing career

Early career
Bozan fought in various organizations in Romania and Austria before signing with the Colosseum Tournament in 2020. He won an International Sport Karate Association (ISKA) World Middleweight title. Bozan amassed a record of 16–5 prior to joining the Colosseum Tournament.

Colosseum Tournament
Bozan was scheduled to make his Colosseum Tournament debut at Colosseum Tournament 20 against Daniel Bolfă. He won the fight via unanimous decision. 

Bozan faced current Colosseum Tournament Featherweight Champion Maxim Răilean in a non-title fight on December 18, 2020 at Colosseum Tournament 22. Răilean moved up a weight class to take on him. Bozan won the fight by unanimous decision.

Fight against Căliniuc
Bozan faced Sorin Căliniuc on February 26, 2021, for the vacant Colosseum Tournament World Lightweight Championship in the main event at Colosseum Tournament 23. Bozan lost the fight via unanimous decision.

After over a year away from the ring, Bozan faced Cosmin-Mădălin Grosu on 9 May 2022 at Colosseum Tournament 31. He won the fight via technical knockout 1 second into the third round.

Featherweight
He announced that he would drop from lightweight to super featherweight for his next fight. Bozan lost a controversial decision to Eduard del Prado at Colosseum Tournament 35 on September 30, 2022.

Training
Bozan used to train at Gym 23 with fellow Aleksandar Rakić, after moving to Ruben Stoia Club in Arad, Romania. From summer 2022, he is based at MMA Estéfano Team in Bucharest.

Championships and accomplishments

Kickboxing
International Sport Karate Association
ISKA World Middleweight Championship (One time)

Kickboxing record

|-  bgcolor= "#FFBBBB"
| 2022-09-30 || Loss ||align=left| Eduard del Prado || Colosseum Tournament 35 || Târgoviște, Romania || Ext. R Decision (unanimous) || 4 || 3:00
|-
|- style="background:#cfc;"
| 2022-05-09 || Win ||align=left| Cosmin-Mădălin Grosu || Colosseum Tournament 31 || Arad, Romania || TKO (towel thrown) || 3 || 0:01
|-
|-  bgcolor= "#FFBBBB"
| 2021-02-26 || Loss ||align=left| Sorin Căliniuc || Colosseum Tournament 23 || Bucharest, Romania || Decision (unanimous) || 5 || 3:00
|-
! style=background:white colspan=9 |
|- 
|- style="background:#cfc;"
| 2020-12-18 || Win ||align=left| Maxim Răilean || Colosseum Tournament 22 || Bucharest, Romania || Decision (unanimous) || 3 || 3:00
|-
|- style="background:#cfc;"
| 2020-10-23 || Win ||align=left| Daniel Bolfă || Colosseum Tournament 20 || Arad, Romania || Decision (unanimous) || 3 || 3:00
|-
|- style="background:#cfc;"
|  2019-11-29 || Win || align="left" | Dominique Pinas || GFC 6: Romania vs. Netherlands || Timișoara, Romania || KO (punches and knee) || 3 || 2:15
|- 
|- style="background:#cfc;"
| 2019-11-09 || Win || align="left" | Vahit İpek || Vendetta XIX || Vienna, Austria || Decision (unanimous) || 5 || 3:00
|-
! style=background:white colspan=9 | 
|- 
|-  bgcolor= "#FFBBBB"
| 2019-06-15 || Loss || align="left" | Chris Wunn || Vendetta XVIII || Vienna, Austria || Decision (unanimous) || 5 || 3:00
|-
! style=background:white colspan=9 | 
|-
|- style="background:#cfc;"
| 2018-08-24 || Win || align="left" | Li Zi Kai || GFC 5: Romania vs. China II || Mamaia, Romania || Decision (unanimous) || 3 || 3:00
|-
|- style="background:#cfc;"
| 2017-11-04 || Win || align="left" | Dietmar Schöpf || Vendetta XIV || Vienna, Austria || KO || 1 || 1:56
|-
|- style="background:#cfc;"
| 2017-06-16 || Win || align="left" | Yang Kunshan || GFC 2: Romania vs. China || Timișoara, Romania || Decision (unanimous) || 3 || 3:00 
|-
|- style="background:#cfc;"
| 2017-05-20 || Win || align="left" | Nikola Crvenkovič || Fight Night || Vienna, Austria || Decision || 3 || 3:00 
|-
|- style="background:#cfc;"
| 2015-12-12 || Win || align="left" | Tony Blijleven || Austrian FC 2 || Vienna, Austria || KO || 1 || 2:32
|- 
| colspan=9 | Legend:

See also
 List of male kickboxers

References

External links
 Official FFC profile

1993 births
Living people
Romanian male karateka
Romanian male kickboxers
Middleweight kickboxers 
Welterweight kickboxers
Romanian expatriate sportspeople in Austria
People from Deva, Romania
SUPERKOMBAT kickboxers
Kickboxing champions
Eastern Orthodox Christians from Romania